The Women's hammer throw at the 2014 Commonwealth Games, as part of the athletics programme, took place at Hampden Park on 27 and 28 July 2014.

Results

Qualification

Final qualification mark was set at 65 metres, and athletes reaching that marked qualified for the final. Where less than twelve made the mark, the first twelve athletes were to qualify for the final as of right. In the event, only three qualified automatically, and nine reached the final without making the mark.

Canada's Sultana Frizell was the best mark from the first round, at 68.92 metres, a new Commonwealth Games record

Final

References

Women's hammer throw
2014
2014 in women's athletics